Jackie Jarvis (born 14 September 1968) is an Australian politician.

At the 2021 Western Australian state election, Jarvis was elected to the Western Australian Legislative Council as a Labor member for South West.

The South West Region covers eight districts, Albany, Bunbury, Collie-Preston, Dawesville, Mandurah, Murray-Wellington, Vasse and Warren-Blackwood.

Jarvis is the Deputy Chair of Committees and is a member of the Standing Committee on Estimates and Financial Operations, the Joint Standing Committee and the Select Committee into Cannabis and Hemp.

Prior to her election, Jarvis held a number of agri-business and regional development roles, and was chief executive of the Rural Regional and Remote Women's Network.

In 2014, she won the WA Rural Women's Award and was the runner-up in the national awards.

In 2019, she was named the Rural Community Leader of the Year at the Farmer of the Year Awards.

Jarvis lives in Margaret River, where she owns and operates a commercial farm and winery business with her husband, Matt.

Career 
In the Legislative Council, Jarvis is the Deputy Chair of Committees and is a member of the Standing Committee on Estimates and Financial Operations, the Joint Standing Committee and the Select Committee into Cannabis and Hemp.

She has established an electorate office in Margaret River.

References 

Living people
Members of the Western Australian Legislative Council
Australian Labor Party members of the Parliament of Western Australia
21st-century Australian politicians
Women members of the Western Australian Legislative Council
1968 births
21st-century Australian women politicians